This is a list of Members of Parliament (MPs) elected in 1640 to the Long Parliament which began in the reign of King Charles I and continued into the Commonwealth.

The fifth and last Parliament of Charles I began at Westminster 3 November 1640 and continued sitting till 20 April 1653, when it was dissolved. There were five additional constituencies which were Ashburton, Honiton and Okehampton in Devon, and Malton and Northallerton in Yorkshire.

The length of the parliament and the turbulent times of the civil war resulted in a considerable turnover of MPs. At election, several MPs were elected for more than one seat, which resulted in re-elections and possible disputes. Some electoral disputes were never resolved within the term of the parliament. In the first year groups of MPs were lost - some were created peers as Charles I wished to strengthen his House of Lords; others were expelled as monopolists or for subversion. As the country plunged into Civil War, the Westminster parliament was divided, with over 150 MPs throwing in their lot with the King, and meeting at Oxford. These were nearly all disabled as a result. Several MPs on both sides were killed in action, adding to the normal roll call of deaths through natural causes. By around 1645 replacements were being elected to replace the disabled members.

In December 1648 the army imposed its will on parliament and large numbers of MPs were excluded under Pride's Purge, creating the Rump Parliament. Many who were not officially excluded did not participate in the affairs of the house. Although the parliament was dissolved in 1653 and four intervening parliaments were called, the Long Parliament was reconvened in 1659 for another dissolution.

This list contains details of the MPs elected in 1640 and shortly afterwards. For the second half of the parliament after around 1645 when a new set of MPs were drafted in, see List of MPs in the English parliament in 1645 and after. There is also a list of MPs not excluded from the English parliament in 1648

List of constituencies and MPs

See also
List of parliaments of England
List of parliaments of Great Britain
List of parliaments of the United Kingdom

References
D. Brunton & D. H. Pennington, Members of the Long Parliament (London: George Allen & Unwin, 1954)
Cobbett's Parliamentary history of England, from the Norman Conquest in 1066 to the year 1803 (London: Thomas Hansard, 1808)

The parliamentary or constitutional history of England;: being a faithful account of all the most remarkable transactions in Parliament, from the earliest times. Collected from the journals of both Houses, the records, ..., Volume 9

 
1640 in England
1640-11